Përlindja e Shqipërisë is a free newspaper published in Albania. Përlindja e Shqipërisë is a politically affiliated daily newspaper and is part of Party for Justice, Integration and Unity.

Content

Sections
The newspaper is organized in three sections, including the magazine.
 News: Includes International, National, Tirana, Politics, Business, Technology, Science, Health, Sports, Education.
 Opinion: Includes Editorials, Op-Eds and Letters to the Editor.
 Features: Includes Arts, Movies, Theater, and Sport.

Web presence
Përlindja e Shqipërisë has had a web presence since 2011. Accessing articles requires none registration.

References

2011 establishments in Albania
Albanian-language newspapers
Free newspapers
Mass media in Tirana
Party newspapers published in Albania
Publications established in 2011